The 12th running of the Ronde van Drenthe, a women's cycling race in the Netherlands, was held on 11 March 2018. It was the second race of the 2018 UCI Women's World Tour. The race was won by Dutch rider Amy Pieters.

Results

References

External links

2018
2018 in Dutch sport
2018 UCI Women's World Tour
Ronde van Drenthe